The Ferrari F60 is a Formula One motor racing car, which Scuderia Ferrari used to compete in the 2009 Formula One season. 

The chassis was designed by Aldo Costa, Simone Resta, Tiziano Battistini, Marco Fainello, John Iley and Marco de Luca with Mario Almondo playing a vital role in leading the production of the car as the team's Executive Technical Director and with Giles Simon in charge of the engine and electronics division assisted by David Salters (engine design and development) and Mattia Binotto (engine operations). 

The car was unveiled on 12 January 2009.

Launch
The F60, the 55th single-seater car produced by Ferrari to compete in Formula One, was named F60 to celebrate the fact that 2009 is Ferrari's 60th year in Formula One, the only team to have competed every year. It was first launched online on 12 January 2009, and Felipe Massa undertook the debut run of the car with a shakedown at Mugello later that day. The car was initially intended to debut at Ferrari's home Fiorano track, but the venue was changed due to poor weather conditions at Maranello.

The F60's first full test took place at the Mugello Circuit during the week of 19 January 2009.

Technology
On average, the Ferrari F60 was 1.9 seconds faster than the last car, despite the new regulations. In the 2009 season, FIA banned the large bargeboards in front of the radiator and the sidepods. It also placed limits on the wheelbase, making it shorter, simpler front splitter, narrower rear spoiler and certain underside air flows, so that it was less disruptive to the car behind. The Ferrari F60 responded to all of this by improving tiny details from the F2008. The front splitter was located further away from the front wheel, and had only 1 layer. Ferrari claimed this improved air flow to the wheels. The F60 was only fitted with 1-tread slick tires, and a simpler suspension positioned a bit backward in angle. Ferrari removed the large airflow plates and replaced it with a small one, also adjusting some underside air flow. The side mirrors were located at the edge of the car's floor. The FIA's ban on small side wings led to the creation of a "cleaner" sidepods acceptable of the smaller engine, and a smooth underside of the chassis. The rear diffuser was revised to meet the regulations that stated it had to produce less downforce.

Through the season

The 2009 season was disappointing in many ways for Ferrari. After scoring no points in the first three races of the season, the F60 scored its first points in Bahrain, the fourth race of the season. Kimi Räikkönen finished sixth, gaining three points for the team. Felipe Massa had a life-threatening accident in the Hungarian Grand Prix, when a spring broke loose from Rubens Barrichello's Brawn GP car and struck Massa on his helmet. He did not start the race and for the rest of the season, he was replaced by Ferrari test driver, Luca Badoer, and later ex-Force India driver Giancarlo Fisichella. Neither driver was able to find any pace with the car and they failed to score any points for the team.

In early August 2009 Ferrari announced that they had stopped developing the F60 in order to concentrate on the 2010 car.

The F60 won its first and only race of 2009 at the hands of Räikkönen at the Belgian Grand Prix, after starting sixth on the grid. They eventually finished fourth in the constructors standings, just behind McLaren, and making 2009 the worst season for Ferrari since 1993. Räikkönen was Ferrari's highest points scoring driver in 2009, finishing sixth in the standings with 48 points, one adrift of fifth-placed Lewis Hamilton of McLaren.

Complete Formula One results
(key) (results in bold indicate pole position; results in italics indicate fastest lap)

References

External links

 Official Ferrari F60 Website

F60
2009 Formula One season cars